Sooni Taraporevala (born 1957) is an Indian screenwriter, photographer and filmmaker who is the screenwriter of Mississippi Masala, The Namesake and Oscar-nominated Salaam Bombay! (1988), all directed by Mira Nair. She also adapted Rohinton Mistry's novel Such A Long Journey (2000) wrote the films Dr. Babasaheb Ambedkar her directorial debut Little Zizou as well as her latest film Yeh Ballet (2020) A Netflix Original that she wrote and directed.

She directed her first feature film, based on a screenplay of her own, an ensemble piece set in Mumbai, in Spring, 2007, entitled Little Zizou. This film explores issues facing the Parsi community to which she belongs.

In 2010 Little Zizou won a National award for Best Film on Family Values

She was awarded the Padma Shri by Government of India in 2014. She is a member of the Academy of Motion Picture Arts and Sciences. Her photographs are in the permanent collections of the National Gallery of Modern Art (NGMA) in Delhi and the Metropolitan Museum of Art in New York.

Early life and education
Taraporevala was born to a Parsi family in Mumbai in 1957. She completed her schooling from Queen Mary School, Mumbai. She received a full scholarship to attend Harvard University as an undergraduate. Though she majored in English and American Literature, she took many film courses including filmmaking taught by Alfred Guzzetti. She met Mira Nair as an undergraduate, leading to their longtime creative collaboration. Next she joined the Cinema Studies Department at New York University, and after receiving her MA in Film Theory and Criticism, in 1981, she returned to India to work as a freelance still photographer. She returned to Los Angeles in 1988 and worked as a screenwriter, writing commissioned screenplays for a wide variety of studios including Universal, HBO and Disney. She moved back to India for good in 1992 .

Screenplays
Taraporevala wrote the screenplays for Salaam Bombay! and Mississippi Masala, both directed by Mira Nair. Other projects with Nair include the screenplay for My Own Country, based on the book by Abraham Verghese, as well as The Namesake (2006), a cinematic adaptation of Pulitzer–winning writer Jhumpa Lahiri's novel, The Namesake.

Her other produced credits include the film Such a Long Journey based on the novel Such a Long Journey by Rohinton Mistry and directed by Sturla Gunnarson, and the screenplay for the film Dr. Babasaheb Ambedkar, directed by Jabbar Patel for the Government of India and the National Film Development Corporation of India (NFDC).

In 2016 she directed a 14-minute documentary virtual reality film Yeh Ballet for Anand Gandhi's Memesys Culture Lab.

In 2020 she wrote and directed a feature film based on her documentary. The Netflix Original film Yeh Ballet produced by Siddharth Roy Kapur and Roy Kapur Films can be seen on Netflix worldwide.

Photography
In 1982, during a break from college, she met photographer Raghubir Singh, who, after looking at her work, which included photographs of her extended Parsi family, suggested she work on a book about the Parsi community. This started her extensive work of photo documentation of the Parsi community.

In 2000, she self-published Parsis, the Zoroastrians of India: a photographic journey, 1980-2000 about the traditionally closed off community since their persecution in Persia, the first and only visual documentation of the Parsi community. An updated edition was published in 2004.

Her photographs have been exhibited in India, the US, France and Britain, including London's Tate Modern gallery.

She has had solo shows at the Carpenter Center for the Visual Arts at Harvard University, Chemould Prescott Road in Mumbai and the National Gallery of Modern Art (NGMA) in Delhi. Her work is in the permanent collections of the NGMA Delhi and the MET New York. 

In 2017/2018, the Whitworth in Manchester exhibited her photographic show Home in the City, Bombay 1977 Mumbai 2017. It was selected by The Guardian as one of UK's top 5 shows.

A larger version of Home in the City with 102 photographs was exhibited at Chemould Prescott Road, Mumbai, from 14 through 31 October 2017. An accompanying book, Home in the city: Bombay 1977 Mumbai 2017, was released with essays by Pico Iyer and Salman Rushdie. It then traveled to the Sunaparanta, Goa Centre for the Arts in Altinho, Goa, opening there on 11 November 2017.

Filmography

Awards
 1988: Lillian Gish award for Excellence in Film from Women in Film, for the screenplay of Salaam Bombay!
 1991: Golden Osella (Best Original Screenplay) Venice Film Festival: Mississippi Masala
2008: Time/Warner Best Screenplay Award at Mahindra Indo-American Arts Council, New York, for Little Zizou
2008: Best Director at Mahindra Indo- American Arts Council, New York, for Little Zizou
2008: Best Producer at Asian Festival of 1ST Films, Singapore, for Little Zizou
2009 : Best Director of Experience Section of Levante International Film Festival, Italy, for Little Zizou
2009 : Audience Choice Award at Indian Film Festival of Los Angeles, (IFFLA) for Little Zizou
 2014: Padma Shri by Government of India )
2020: Filmfare nomination for Best Film Web Original, for Yeh Ballet

Memberships
 Academy of Motion Picture Arts and Sciences (2017–present)
 Writers Guild of America (1989–present)

References

External links

Biography:
 Official Website
 Trailer of upcoming documentary on Taraporevala
 SAWNET biography
 
 http://www.thecrimson.com/article/2012/10/30/sooni-taraporevala-parsis-zizou/ at The Harvard Crimson
 https://www.metmuseum.org/art/collection/search/719511 at THE MET
 https://www.livemint.com/Leisure/VcDlKlKfiCz3SFxHE6TBrM/Sooni-Taraporevala-To-Bombay-with-love.html at Mint
 http://www.gallerychemould.com/exhibitions/sooni-taraporevala-bombay-mumbai-black-white-photographs/ 
 https://thewire.in/culture/bombay-mumbai-seen-sooni-taraporewalas-sharp-eye at THE WIRE

Misc.:
 NPR radio feature at Npr
 Iranian.com feature 
 St Louis Post-Dispatch- NYTimes wire story

1957 births
Living people
Indian women screenwriters
Indian women photographers
Parsi people from Mumbai
Indian women film directors
Screenwriters from Mumbai
Harvard University alumni
Tisch School of the Arts alumni
Social documentary photographers
Recipients of the Padma Shri in arts
Gujarati-language film directors
20th-century Indian photographers
21st-century Indian photographers
Indian photojournalists
Indian movie stills photographers
21st-century Indian women writers
21st-century Indian writers
21st-century Indian dramatists and playwrights
21st-century Indian women artists
20th-century Indian women writers
20th-century Indian writers
20th-century Indian women artists
20th-century Indian film directors
Indian portrait photographers
Women writers from Maharashtra
Women artists from Maharashtra
Film directors from Mumbai
Photographers from Maharashtra
Directors who won the Best Film on Family Welfare National Film Award
20th-century women photographers
21st-century women photographers
Women photojournalists